Rasmus Andersson (born 27 October 1996) is a Swedish professional ice hockey player. He is currently playing for the  Calgary Flames organization of the National Hockey League (NHL). He was drafted in the 2015 NHL Entry Draft by the Flames, 53rd overall.

Rasmus' older brother Calle and father Peter were both drafted by the New York Rangers, in 2012 and 1983, respectively.

Playing career
Andersson made his professional debut in his native Sweden, with his local club from youth Malmö Redhawks. He appeared in 38 games in the HockeyAllsvenskan for 11 points in the 2012–13 season. 

Andersson left Sweden and followed his family footsteps to North America by playing a major junior season with the Barrie Colts in the Ontario Hockey League before he was selected by the Flames in the 2015 NHL Entry Draft.

On 15 September 2015, Andersson was signed to a three-year entry-level contract with the Calgary Flames.

Andersson began his professional career during the 2016–17 season with the Stockton Heat of the AHL, recording 22 points in 54 games. Andersson also made his NHL debut on 8 April 2017 against the San Jose Sharks. The 3–1 loss was the Flames' final game of the regular season.

Andersson started the 2017–18 season with the Stockton Heat. He was called up to the NHL for the first time that season on 9 November 2017. His call up did not last long and he was sent back down to the AHL on 13 November 2017 after playing one game. Andersson was selected as the sole representative of the Heat for the 2018 AHL All-Star Game. He was called up to the NHL for the second time that season on 19 March 2018.

Andersson participated at the Flames 2018–19 training camp but was cut before the final roster was finalized. His reassignment to the Heat was short lived, however, as following the Flames season opener, they placed Travis Hamonic on Injured Reserve and recalled Andersson to the NHL.

During the 2019–20 season, having established himself amongst the Flames as a top-four pairing defenseman, on January 8, 2019, Andersson signed a six-year, $27.3 million contract extension with the Flames.

Career statistics

Regular season and playoffs

International

Awards and honours

References

External links

1996 births
Living people
Barrie Colts players
Calgary Flames draft picks
Calgary Flames players
Swedish expatriate ice hockey players in Canada
Malmö Redhawks players
Stockton Heat players
Swedish ice hockey defencemen
Sportspeople from Malmö